Suleiman Sharifi (born 1958) is a Tajikistani artist. A Member of the Union of Artists of Tajikistan, his works are held in museums and private collections of Tajikistan, Russia, Europe and Asia.

References

Tajikistani artists
1958 births
Living people
Place of birth missing (living people)
Date of birth missing (living people)